Maggie Mae (1960–2021) was a German singer.

Maggie Mae may also refer to:

"Maggie Mae" (folk song), a traditional Liverpudlian song performed by The Beatles

See also
 Maggie May (disambiguation)